Anzara County is an administrative area in Gbudwe State, South Sudan.

References

Counties of South Sudan